The Netherlands participated at the 2010 Winter Olympics in Vancouver, British Columbia, Canada. The Dutch team consisted of 34 competitors and participated in bobsleigh, short track speed skating, snowboarding, and speed skating.

The Dutch team won eight medals, of which four are gold medals. Seven medals were won in speed skating, one in snowboarding. The gold medal Nicolien Sauerbreij won on the women's parallel giant slalom was the first Dutch medal outside speed skating at the Winter Olympics since Sjoukje Dijkstra's medal for figure skating in 1964 and the 100th Dutch gold medal at the Olympics overall. This was also the first medal for the Netherlands at the Winter Olympics at a snow event.

Records

Olympic record
Sven Kramer set a new Olympic record of 6:14.60 in the 5000m men's longtrack speedskating event. He also finished in an Olympic record time in the 10,000 m, but he was disqualified for finishing in the wrong lane.

Jan Blokhuijsen, Sven Kramer, Simon Kuipers and Mark Tuitert set a new Olympic record of 3:39.95 in the men's team pursuit longtrack speedskating event. It brought them no more than the bronze medal, since they had lost their semifinal before.

Track records
Mark Tuitert set a new track record of 1:45.57 in the men's 1500m longtrack speedskating event. Ireen Wüst equalled the track record of 1:56.89 in the women's 1500 m race. The above-mentioned 5,000 m and men's team pursuit Olympic records were also track records.

Medalists

Bobsleigh

Men & Women

Short track speed skating

Men

Women

Snowboarding

Women

Men

Speed skating

Men

Women

See also

Netherlands at the 2010 Winter Paralympics
Netherlands at the Olympics

References

External links
  Gekwalificeerd voor Olympische Winterspelen van Vancouver 2010, from the Dutch Olympic Committee, retrieved 10 January 2010.
  Tweede Olympisch ticket van Calker, retrieved 9 January 2010.

2010 in Dutch sport
Nations at the 2010 Winter Olympics
2010